Claus Egil Feyling (born 9 December 1916 in Egersund, died 2 March 1989) was a Norwegian politician for the Conservative Party.

He was elected to the Norwegian Parliament from Rogaland in 1977, and was re-elected on one occasion.

On the local level he was a member of Sokndal municipal council from 1967 to 1975, serving as mayor since 1971. From 1971 to 1975 he was also a member of Rogaland county council.

Outside politics he worked as an engineer. He was active in Rotary.

References

1916 births
1989 deaths
People from Egersund
Members of the Storting
Mayors of places in Rogaland
Conservative Party (Norway) politicians
20th-century Norwegian politicians